Siddharth Menon (born 1 July 1989) is an Indian playback singer, actor, co-founder and vocalist  of Thaikkudam Bridge music band. He has rendered some film songs but is most popular for his band Thaikkudam Bridge. His rendition of "Mandaracheppundo" from the film Dasharatham for a musical show Music Mojo in the Malayalam channel Kappa TV topped the music charts.

Early life and education
Siddharth Menon was born in a Mumbai-settled Kerala family of Sathyanathan Pariyadath and Sheela on 1 July 1989, and was brought up in Mumbai.  His father, Sathyanathan, is a former employee of an airline company and hails from Irinjalakkuda, Trissur. His mother, Sheela, works with the income tax department in Mumbai and hails from Vaikom, Kottayam. He studied in Vivek Vidyalaya High School, Goregaon, Maharashtra. He attended Vivek College of Commerce where he received a degree in commerce. After graduation he decided to study western classical music and joined A R Rahman’s music college, KM Music Conservatory in Chennai . At present, he resides in Kochi, Kerala.
He married Marathi  actress Tanvi Palav on 22 December 2019.

Career
Siddharth Menon grew up in Mumbai with his Malayali parents, attending competitions and youth festivals and winning prizes for music. All he has to show is about a few days he attended in Ajivasan Music Academy in Mumbai. But that never dampened his passion for singing.

He performed in the Sony TV reality show, X Factor India, and his group Nirmitee was the finalist of the show. The other members in the group were Vian Fernandez, Pranil More and Ranjana Raja.

His first cousin Govind Menon composed songs for the musical show "Music Mojo" in Kappa TV, and "Nostalgia" (the reincarnation of evergreen Malayalam songs), in which Siddharth sang "Mandharachepundo", became a hit on YouTube. Both of them together started the musical band Thaikkudam Bridge.

Siddharth made his debut in playback singing with the song "Tharangal" in the 2013 film North 24 Kaatham.

His debut into the Malayalam film industry was through the movie Rockstar directed by V.K.Prakash in the year 2015.He has also acted and sung in Musical albumYelove along with Shreya Ghoshal, the song was released on 7 June 2014. As of 2014, Yelove has achieved 1 million views on YouTube . The next year he again became a part of album Yami.

As of 2019, he has also acted in films like Koode, Solo in supporting roles and Kadha paranja kadha and Kolambi in lead roles. He also performed in a TV show Autumn leaf on Amrita TV. He is also a stage performer and has performed in many award shows in Malayalam.

Awards

Filmography

Discography

Film Songs

Other songs

References

External links
Siddharth Menon's official Facebook page
Siddharth Menon

1989 births
Living people
Indian male playback singers
Singers from Mumbai
South Indian International Movie Awards winners